The Delta Special School District was a school district of Rohwer, unincorporated Desha County, Arkansas, USA. Its territory is now in the McGehee School District. It also included Watson.

The district had two schools, Delta Elementary School and Delta High School.

History
The district formed in 1972 by the merger of the Desha Special School District and the Watson School District.

In 2004, the Arkansas Legislature approved a law that forced school districts with fewer than 350 students to consolidate with other districts. Both the McGehee and Delta school districts petitioned the Arkansas Board of Education, asking for an annexation of Delta into McGehee. The board approved the annexation on April 26, 2004. On July 1, 2004, the Delta Special School District and the Arkansas City School District were merged into the McGehee district.

References

Further reading
 Map of Arkansas School Districts pre-July 1, 2004
  (Download) - includes boundaries of the predecessor districts (Desha Special and Watson)

External links

 Delta Special School District (Archive)

Defunct school districts in Arkansas
Education in Desha County, Arkansas
1972 establishments in Arkansas
School districts established in 1972
2004 disestablishments in Arkansas
School districts disestablished in 2004